Lin Weining (Chinese: 林伟宁; born March 15, 1979, in Changyi County, Shandong) is a Chinese weightlifter. She began with wushu in 1991, and switched to weightlifting in 1992. She joined the provincial weightlifting team four years later.

Major performances
1999 National Championships - 2nd 69 kg
1999 World Women&apos;s Youth Championships - 1st 69 kg snatch, C&J & total, breaking WR in snatch (137.5 kg)
1999 Asian Championships - 1st 69 kg snatch, C&J & total, breaking WRs in C&J (142.5 kg) and total (252.5 kg)
2000 National Championships - 2nd 69 kg total (252.5 kg)
2000 Sydney Olympic Games - 1st 69 kg

References
  - China Daily

1979 births
Living people
Olympic weightlifters of China
Weightlifters at the 2000 Summer Olympics
Olympic gold medalists for China
Olympic medalists in weightlifting
Weightlifters from Shandong
People from Weifang
Chinese female weightlifters

Medalists at the 2000 Summer Olympics
20th-century Chinese women
21st-century Chinese women